Düzköy (formerly Haçka) is a town and district of Trabzon Province in the Black Sea region of Turkey. The mayor is Abidin Çelik (CHP).

References

Populated places in Trabzon Province
Districts of Trabzon Province